Qasem Soleimani Dashtaki (born 1955) is an Iranian reformist politician, who served as the  governor of  Khuzestan Province from February 2021 to September 2021. Dashtaki was Governor of Chaharmahal and Bakhtiari Province from 2013 to 2017 and Governor of Ilam Province from 2017 to 2021. Dashtaki was born in Dashtak in Chaharmahal and Bakhtiari Province.

References

1955 births
Governors of Chaharmahal and Bakhtiari Province
Living people
Executives of Construction Party politicians